The Hudson Mountains are a mountain range in western Ellsworth Land just east of Cranton Bay and Pine Island Bay at the eastern extremity of Amundsen Sea. They are of volcanic origin, consisting of low scattered mountains and nunataks that protrude through the West Antarctic Ice Sheet. The Hudson Mountains are bounded on the north by Cosgrove Ice Shelf and on the south by Pine Island Glacier.

Geology
The Hudson Mountains contain slightly eroded parasitic cones that overlie three extensively eroded Miocene stratovolcanoes: Mount Manthe, Teeters Nunatak and Mount Moses. Potential steam was reported in 1974 and an unconfirmed report of an eruption detected by satellite was made in 1985, indicating that the Hudson Mountains may be volcanically active.

Volcanic activity of the Hudson Mountains has produced predominantly subaerial basaltic lava flows, although subglacial or subaqueous tuffs and lava flows have also been noted. A tephra layer deposited from a subglacial eruption has been dated at about 200 BCE based on ice thickness.

History
The full extent of the group was mapped by USGS from US Navy air photos of 1966. Named by US-SCAN after Captain William L. Hudson, commander of  during USEE, 1838–1842. Peacock, accompanied by  under Lieutenant Walker, cruised along the edge of the pack to the north of this area for several days during the latter part of March 1839.

On January, 2008, the British Antarctic Survey scientists led by Hugh Corr and David Vaughan, reported (in the journal Nature Geoscience) that 2,200 years ago, a volcano had a subglacial eruption under the Antarctic ice sheet, based on airborne survey with radar images. Described as the biggest eruption in Antarctica in the last 10,000 years, the volcanic ash was found deposited on the ice surface under the Hudson Mountains, close to Pine Island Glacier.

See also 
 List of volcanoes in Antarctica

Further reading 
 Corr, H., & Vaughan, D.(2008). A recent volcanic eruption beneath the West Antarctic ice sheet. Nature Geoscience, Vol. 1(no. 2), p. 122-125. doi:10.1038/ngeo106
 Corr H F J, Vaughan D G, 2008. A recent volcanic eruption beneath the West Antarctica ice sheet. Nature Geosci, 1: 122-125.
 Craddock C, Bastien T W, Rutford R H, 1964. Geology of the Jones Mountains area. In: Adie R J (ed) Antarctic Geol, Proc 1st Internatl Symp Antarctic Geol, Amsterdam: Elsevier, p 172-187.
 Dort W, 1972. Late Cenozoic volcanism in Antarctica. In: Adie R J (ed) Antarctic Geol and Geophys, IUGS Ser-B(1): 645-652.
 LeMasurier W E, 1972. Volcanic record of Cenozoic glacial history Marie Byrd Land. In: Adie R J (ed) Antarctic Geol and Geophys, IUGS Ser-B(1): 251-260.
 LeMasurier W E, Thomson J W (eds), 1990. Volcanoes of the Antarctic Plate and Southern Oceans. Washington, D C: Amer Geophys Union, 487

References

External links 

 Hudson Mountains on USGS website
 Hudson Mountains on SCAR website
 Hudson Mountains on VOGRIPA
 Hudson Mountains on Smithsonian Institution website
 Hudson Mountains on volcanodiscovery
 Hudson Mountains updated sunrise/sunset / moonrise/moonset times
 Hudson Mountains long term updated weather forecast on mountain-forecast website

Bibliography
 

 
Volcanoes of Ellsworth Land
Miocene stratovolcanoes
Active volcanoes
Landforms of Ellsworth Land